Pascal Allizard (born 19 December 1962) is a member of the Senate of France.  He was first elected in 2014, and represents the Calvados department.  An Industrial Business Manager by profession, he serves as a member of the LR. He has been the mayor of Condé-en-Normandie since 2016. He was mayor of Condé-sur-Noireau from 1995 until the commune merged with La Chapelle-Engerbold, Lénault, Proussy, Saint-Germain-du-Crioult and Saint-Pierre-la-Vieille to become Condé-en-Normandie.

References

*Page on the French Senate website

1962 births
Living people
French Senators of the Fifth Republic
University of Caen Normandy alumni
Mayors of places in Normandy
The Republicans (France) politicians
Senators of Calvados (department)